The Department of Mad Scientists: How DARPA is Remaking Our World, from the Internet to Artificial Limbs is a book by Michael Belfiore about the history and origins of DARPA. Belfiore describes DARPA's creation as the agency ARPA in Department of Defense and some of its notable contributions to artificial limbs, the Internet, space exploration and robotic automobiles.

Belfiore also highlights some of the unique aspects of DARPA's internal structure such as term limits for project managers, willingness to fund ambitious research, and subcontracting of all research.

External links

After Words interview with Belfiore on The Department of Mad Scientists, August 21, 2010

Science books
Engineering books
DARPA
2009 non-fiction books